The Supreme Commander of the Unified Armed Forces of the Warsaw Treaty Organization was a post in overall command of the military forces of the Warsaw Pact. Furthermore, the Supreme Commander was also a First Deputy Minister of Defense of the Soviet Union. The post, which was instituted in 1955 and abolished in 1991, was always held by a Soviet officer.

List of officeholders

See also
 Supreme Allied Commander Europe – NATO counterpart
 Chief of Combined Staff of the Unified Armed Forces of the Warsaw Treaty Organization

Notes

References

Warsaw Pact